Williams Stadium, on the Campus of Wilmington College in Wilmington, Ohio, is a 3,500-seat multi-purpose football stadium that is home to the Wilmington College Quakers football, men's and women's soccer, and men's and women's lacrosse teams.

History
Wilmington College football has been played at Townsend Field since 1900. Williams Stadium was constructed in 1983, which increased seating capacity to 3,500. Beckett Track and Field facility was added in 1994. In 2008, the Townsend Field playing field was resurfaced with synthetic turf and new lighting was installed, allowing for night games to be played at the College.
Along with the Wilmington College Quakers football team playing on Townsend field at Williams Stadium, Wilmington College's new Lacrosse teams began play on the field in the spring of 2013. Wilmington High School's football team has also played on the field since its re-surfacing in 2008.

WC Night Games
Wilmington began playing night games in the 2008 season, with a game against Marietta College, which the Quakers won 34-7. Wilmington has not won another home game at night since then.

Stadium Milestones
 First Football game on turf: September 20, 2008: vs. Marietta College, W 34–7
 First Men's Lacrosse game: February 23, 2013: vs. DePauw University, W 8–6
 First Women's Lacrosse game: February 27, 2013: vs. Alma College, L 5–23
 First Men's Soccer game: August 30, 2014: vs. Franklin College, W 4–0
 First Women's Soccer game: September 3, 2014: vs. Wittenberg University, L 0–4

References 

High school football venues in Ohio
1900 establishments in Ohio